Justin Walsh (born April 15, 1972) is an American politician who served in the Pennsylvania House of Representatives from the 58th district from 2017 to 2019. In 2019 he was elected a judge in Westmoreland County, Pennsylvania.

References

1972 births
Living people
Republican Party members of the Pennsylvania House of Representatives